Mohammad Fazel is the name of:
 Mohammad Fazl (born 1967), a Taliban leader held for over nine years in the Guantanamo Bay detention camps
 Mohammed Fazal (1922–2014), Governor of Maharashtra from October 10, 2002, to December 5, 2004
 Mohamed Fazal, an athlete in Sri Lanka's Kit Premier League
 Mohamed Said Fazul (born 1960), president of the Comorian island of Mohéli, 2002–2007